Okabe is a Japanese surname. Notable people with the surname include:

, Japanese politician
, Japanese music composer
, Japanese World War II flying ace
, Japanese electrical engineer and scientist
, Japanese judge
Leandro Okabe (born 1985), Japanese-Brazilian model
, Japanese samurai
, Japanese general
, Japanese architect
, Japanese general
, Japanese engineer and assistant of Thomas Edison
, Japanese swimmer

Fictional characters
Keiko Okabe, a character in the novel Hotel on the Corner of Bitter and Sweet
, protagonist of the visual novel Steins;Gate

Japanese-language surnames